Arthur Chichester, 1st Baron Chichester (1563–1625) was an English administrator and Lord Deputy of Ireland

Arthur Chichester may also refer to:

Arthur Chichester, 1st Earl of Donegall (1606–1675)
Arthur Chichester, 2nd Earl of Donegall (died 1678)
Arthur Chichester, 3rd Earl of Donegall (1666–1706)
Arthur Chichester, 1st Marquess of Donegall (1739–1799)
Patrick Chichester, 8th Marquess of Donegall (Arthur Patrick Chichester, born 1952)
Arthur Chichester (MP for Honiton)  (1777–1866)
Arthur Chichester, 1st Baron Templemore (1797–1837)
Arthur Chichester, 4th Baron Templemore (1880–1953)
Lord Arthur Chichester (1808–1840)
 Arthur Chichester, pen name of the author Benjamin Rich

See also
Chichester (disambiguation)